Munimuni is a Filipino indie folk band from Quezon City, Philippines. The band currently consists of Adj Jiao (guitar, vocals), John Owen Castro (flute, vocals), Jolo Ferrer (bass), Josh Tumaliuan (drums), and Ben Ayes (guitar).

History

Formation (2012-2013)
Munimuni were formed in UP Diliman, where TJ de Ocampo met Adj Jiao who was, at that time, doing a musical project with Red Calayan. They figured out that they had similar tastes in music, so they started writing and arranging songs together.

A year after their start, de Ocampo was sent to Japan as an exchange student, and the band added John Owen Castro as the band's session keyboardist. Munimuni kept on doing gigs while de Ocampo was away.

Simula EP (2017)
In 2017, Munimuni released their debut EP titled Simula. The EP featured the songs "Sa Hindi Pag-alala", "Sa'yo", and "Marilag".

Kulayan Natin (2019)
Two years after releasing their debut EP, Munimuni finally released their debut album. Titled Kulayan Natin, it featured the songs "Tahanan", "Oras", "Kalachuchi", and "Solomon" (featuring Filipina singer Clara Benin).

Hiatus (2020)
On September 30, 2020, the band announced on Twitter that they will be on a hiatus.

The comeback #MaligayaAngPagbabalik (2021)
On June 9, 2021, the band announced their comeback with a social media hashtag, along with a new song titled "Maligaya" and TJ de Ocampo's departure from the band.

Band members

Current members
 Adj Jiao – guitar, lead vocals, backing vocals (2012–present)
 John Owen Castro – flute, backing vocals, occasional lead vocals (2014–present)
 Jolo Ferrer – bass, backing vocals (2017–present)
 Josh Tumaliuan – drums, backing vocals (2018–present)
 Ben Ayes - guitar (2023-present)

Past members
 Red Calayan - drums, backing vocals (2012–2018)
 TJ de Ocampo - guitar, lead vocals, backing vocals (2012–2020)

Discography

Studio albums 
 Kulayan Natin (2019)

EPs 
 Simula (2017)
búhay/buháy (2021)

Singles 

 "Tahanan" (2018)
 "Oras" (2018)
 "Kalachuchi" (2018)
 "Pop Machine: Minsan" (2019)
"mga kantang isinulat mag-isa" (2020)
"Talinghaga" (2020)
"Alat" (2020)
"Sanggol" (2020)
"Maligaya" (2021)
"Ambag Ko" (2021)
Matimtiman (2022)
Sikat ng Araw (2023)

Accolades

References

Filipino pop music groups
Sony Music Philippines artists
Musical groups from Metro Manila
Musical groups established in 2013
2013 establishments in the Philippines
Musical groups disestablished in 2020
Musical groups reestablished in 2021